Fraley may refer to:

 Fraley (surname)
 Fraley Island, Nunavut
 Fraley v. Facebook, Inc., a California class action lawsuit alleging misappropriation of Facebook users' names and likenesses in advertisements
 Fraley syndrome, dilation of a portion of the upper renal calyx due to compression by the upper branch of the renal artery